James Goodfellow (21 August 1850 – 22 July 1924) was an Australian cricketer. He played in one first-class match for South Australia in 1880/81.

Goodfellow's brother George also played first-class cricket.

See also
 List of South Australian representative cricketers

References

External links
 

1850 births
1924 deaths
Australian cricketers
South Australia cricketers
People from Surrey